Francis C. Heitmeier (born August 2, 1950) is Louisiana politician who served in the Louisiana State Senate, representing Orleans, Jefferson, and Plaquemines parishes, from 1991 to 2007.

Raised in the Algiers neighborhood of New Orleans, Heitmeier received his undergraduate degree from Nicholls State University in Thibodaux, Louisiana. He served on the Orleans Parish Democratic 
Executive Committee from 1978 to 1984 and in the Louisiana House of Representatives from 1984 to 1992.

Heitmeier won election to the state senate in 1991 by a large margin, and was reelected in a contested election in 1995, thereafter running unopposed in 1999 and 2003. Ineligible to run in 2007 due to term limits, he instead ran in a special election for Louisiana Secretary of State in 2006, the office having been vacated by the death of incumbent W. Fox McKeithen. Heitmeier finished the first round of voting in second place, but withdrew from the runoff, complaining of lack of funds.

References

1950 births
Living people
Louisiana state senators
Members of the Louisiana House of Representatives
Louisiana Democrats
Politicians from New Orleans
Nicholls State University alumni
Businesspeople from Louisiana
American lobbyists
Catholics from Louisiana